Kenneth Joyce may refer to:

Kenneth Joyce, character in The Accused (1988 film)
Ken Joyce, baseball coach in 1998 Florida Marlins season